The 2013 American League Wild Card Game was a play-in game during Major League Baseball's (MLB) 2013 postseason played between the American League's (AL) two wild card teams, the Cleveland Indians and the Tampa Bay Rays (the latter winners of a one-game tie-breaker against the Texas Rangers). It was held at Progressive Field in Cleveland, Ohio, on October 2, 2013. The Rays won by a 4–0 score and advanced to the AL Division Series to face the Boston Red Sox, who went on to become the World Series champion of that year. The game was televised on TBS.

Game results

Line score

Rays starting pitcher Alex Cobb recorded  shutout innings and five strikeouts and three relievers pitched  shutout innings. Delmon Young led off the top of the third inning with a home run and Desmond Jennings hit a two-run double in the fourth off of Danny Salazar. Yunel Escobar had an RBI single in the ninth off of Joe Smith, the run charged to Cody Allen. Rays manager Joe Maddon and Indians manager Terry Francona would meet each other again three years later in the 2016 World Series, with Maddon, as manager of the Chicago Cubs, winning 4–3. The Indians also became the first team in MLB history to be eliminated from the postseason without scoring a run.

References

External links
2013 American League Wild Card Game at Baseball Reference

American League Wild Card Game
Cleveland Indians postseason
Tampa Bay Rays postseason
American League Wild Card Game
2010s in Cleveland
Major League Baseball Wild Card Game
American League Wild Card Game